Ryan Peterson (born December 26, 1995) is an American professional footballer who plays for the Charlotte Independence in USL League One.

Career

Youth and college
Peterson grew up in the Budd Lake section of Mount Olive Township, New Jersey where he attended Mount Olive High School and played youth soccer for Players Development Academy (PDA). While with PDA, he helped the Under-17/18 Academy team to a U.S. Soccer Development Academy U-17/18 Championship in 2014. In the final on Saturday, July 19, Peterson scored the team's second goal, assisted by future Major League Soccer player Brian White, against Bethesda-Olney (MD) in the 2–0 win at StubHub Center in Carson, California. Peterson also played college soccer for four years at two NCAA Division I universities. He attended North Carolina State University for two years and played in 33 games while scoring three goals. Following his sophomore year, he transferred to Rutgers University and played two more seasons, scoring four goals in 30 games.

Amateur
While still attending North Carolina State, Peterson spent the summer of 2015 playing with the Ocean City Nor'easters of the Premier Developmental League. In 2019, Peterson joined National Premier Soccer League side Detroit City FC following the conclusion of the regular season. He spent the late summer and early fall with the club competing in the 2019 NPSL Members Cup tournament. Detroit went on the win the competition with Peterson competing in a majority of the team's games. He also scored the lone goal in Detroit's friendly against the Philadelphia Fury, a professional side in the National Independent Soccer Association which Detroit was in the process of joining.

Prior to this in 2019 Peterson also appeared with USL Championship side Pittsburgh Riverhounds SC in a pre-season friendly against the Cleveland State Vikings men's soccer team. However he was not signed to the final roster ahead of the regular season.

FC Motown
Peterson spent multiple stints with Morristown, New Jersey amateur side FC Motown prior to and in-between playing with professional teams. While mainly competing in the National Premier Soccer League and later USL League Two, he also made appearances for the club in their state and regional leagues across USASA Region I. He made his NPSL debut on Saturday, May 18, 2019, coming on as a first half substitute against the Electric City Shock SC in a 3–1 road win.

During his third year with the team in 2022 Peterson had his most successful season with the club. On April 1, following a successful protest by Motown, Peterson scored the game winning goal against West Chester United SC in the 90th minute of their 2022 U.S. Open Cup First Round replay. He played in all three of Motown's tournament matches that year, plus the original first round match that was later replayed. In league, Motown won the 2022 NPSL National Championship with Peterson scoring the opening goal against Crossfire Redmond in the final.

Professional

National Independent Soccer Association
On February 25, 2020, Peterson signed his first professional contract with Stumptown Athletic of the third division National Independent Soccer Association. He started both of the team's games that season before the COVID-19 pandemic forced the cancellation of the Spring Season.

On August 11 Peterson returned to Detroit City FC, now playing in NISA, ahead of the Fall 2020 season. In the 2020 NISA Fall Championship he scored the game-winning goal against Oakland Roots SC in the 85th minute to give Detroit its first professional title. He departed the team following the fall season.

On October 8, 2021, Peterson signed with San Diego 1904 FC.

Charlotte Independence
Peterson signed with USL League One club Charlotte Independence on September 22, 2022. He made his first appearance on Saturday, October 1, as a second half substitute in a 3–1 loss to the Chattanooga Red Wolves SC.

Career statistics

Honors
Detroit City FC
NPSL Members Cup: 2019
NISA Fall Championship: 2020
NISA Independent Cup Great Lakes Region: 2020

FC Motown
NPSL National Championship: 2022
NPSL East Regional Championship: 2022
NPSL Keystone Conference Championship: 2019, 2021, 2022
New Jersey Soccer Association Men's Open State Cup: 2021–22

References

External links
 
 USL League Two profile
 New Jersey Soccer Association profile v1
 New Jersey Soccer Association profile v2
 North Carolina State profile
 Rutgers profile

1995 births
Living people
American soccer players
Soccer players from New Jersey
People from Mount Olive Township, New Jersey
Sportspeople from Morris County, New Jersey
Association football forwards
Charlotte Independence players
Detroit City FC players
FC Motown players
Ocean City Nor'easters players
Stumptown AC players
NC State Wolfpack men's soccer players
Rutgers Scarlet Knights men's soccer players
National Independent Soccer Association players
National Premier Soccer League players
USL League One players
USL League Two players